Zhang Cheng (born 28 June 1989) is a Chinese professional footballer who currently plays for Chinese club Tianjin Fusheng.

Club career
Zhang Cheng joined China League Two side Tianjin Songjiang in 2008 after failing his trial at Tianjin TEDA and Tianjin Huochetou. He kept his start position in the 2016 season when Quanjian Nature Medicine took over the club. He made 27 league appearances and scored two goals as Tianjin Quanjian won the title and promoted to the Chinese Super League. He made his Super League debut on 4 March 2017 in a 2–0 away loss against Guangzhou R&F.

At thee beginning of the 2020 Chinese Super League, Zhang was allowed to join Jiangsu Suning and would go on to make his debut in a league game against Henan Jianye on 26 July 2020 in a 4-3 victory. In his debut season he would be a squad player as the team would win the title for the first time within their history.

Career statistics
.

Honours

Club
Tianjin Quanjian
China League One: 2016

Jiangsu Suning
Chinese Super League: 2020

References

External links
 

1989 births
Living people
Chinese footballers
Footballers from Tianjin
Tianjin Tianhai F.C. players
Jiangsu F.C. players
Chinese Super League players
China League One players
China League Two players
Association football defenders